Haplothrix simplex is a species of beetle in the family Cerambycidae. It was described by Charles Joseph Gahan in 1888, originally misspelled as Hoplothrix simplex. It is known from Thailand and Laos.

References

Lamiini
Beetles described in 1888